Yasui (written: 安井 or 保井) is a Japanese surname. Notable people with the surname include:

, Japanese judge
, Japanese swimmer
, Japanese politician
, Japanese businessman
, Japanese biologist
, Japanese voice actor
, American lawyer
, Japanese politician
, Japanese photographer
, Japanese Go player
, Japanese Go player
, Japanese actor
, Japanese Confucian scholar
, Japanese painter
, Japanese economist
, Japanese footballer
, Japanese fencer
, Japanese politician

See also
Yasui house, one of the four Schools of Go during the Edo period
Yasui procedure, a pediatric heart operation
Yasui v. United States (1943), a decision by the Supreme Court of the United States

Japanese-language surnames